
Lac de Moiry is a reservoir in the municipality of Grimentz, Switzerland.

Geography 
The lake has a surface area of 1.40 km² and an elevation of 2,249 m. The maximum depth is 120 m.

The dam is 148 m high and was completed in 1958.

See also
List of lakes of Switzerland
List of mountain lakes of Switzerland

External links 

Cycling profile to Lac de Moiry

Moiry Dam
Moiry
Moiry
Moiry

References